Hoplophryne rogersi, also known as the Tanzania banana frog, Usambara banana frog, Usambara blue-bellied frog, and Roger's three-fingered frog, is a species of frog in the family Microhylidae. It is endemic to north-eastern Tanzania and known from the Usambara, Magrotto, and Nguru Mountains of Tanga Region. The specific name rogersi honours F. W. Rogers, the custodian of the Amani Research Institute at the time of the describers' visit to Usambara.

Description
The body is stout. Males have only three fingers as the thumb is reduced to a stump with a sharp, protruding bone. No webbing is present. The dorsum is smooth with small spines; there are larger spines on the throat, lips, chest, and limbs. The dorsum is slate-blue to grey-brown. A darker stripe runs from the snout to along the side of the body to the knee. The leggs have dark crossbars. The underside is black with blue or white vermiculations.

Habitat and conservation
It is active in leaf litter by day. It can be found in moderately disturbed habitats, but not in heavily disturbed forest or in open areas. Although generally rare and difficult to find outside the breeding season, it is easily found in the Amani Botanic Garden where it uses the extensive stands of exotic bamboo for breeding. The eggs are laid in phytotelmata: hollow bamboo stems, leaf axils, and tree holes. The larvae develop in these same microhabitats.

Hoplophryne rogersi is likely negatively affected by ongoing forest loss and degradation. It occurs in several, relatively well-protected areas.

References

rogersi
Frogs of Africa
Amphibians of Tanzania
Endemic fauna of Tanzania
Amphibians described in 1928
Taxa named by Thomas Barbour
Taxa named by Arthur Loveridge
Taxonomy articles created by Polbot